Which Way is Up? is a 1977 American comedy film starring Richard Pryor and directed by Michael Schultz. It is a remake of the 1972 Italian comedy film The Seduction of Mimi. Richard Pryor plays three roles: an orange picker who has two women at the same time, the orange picker's father, and a reverend who gets the orange picker's wife pregnant.

Plot
When he falls into a union action by mistake, Leroy Jones is forced out of town. The only option given to Leroy was a one way bus ticket to Los Angeles, where more jobs are available. While he is away, Leroy becomes smitten with Vanetta, a beautiful labor activist. When he returns home, he has to juggle his wife, his new romance with Vanetta, and his new job. Meanwhile, the Reverend Lenox Thomas takes advantage of Leroy's absence to cavort with Annie Mae, leading Leroy to take revenge with the reverend's wife.

Cast
 Richard Pryor as Leroy Jones / Rufus Jones / Reverend Lenox Thomas
 Lonette McKee as Vanetta
 Margaret Avery as Annie Mae
 Morgan Woodward as Mr. Mann
 Marilyn Coleman as Sister Sarah
 BeBe Drake-Hooks as Thelma
 Gloria Edwards as Janelle
 Ernesto Hernandez as Jose Reyes
 Otis Day as Sugar
 Morgan Roberts as Henry
 Diane Rodriguez as Estrella Reyes
 Dolph Sweet as The Boss
 Timothy Thomerson as Tour Guide
 Danny Valdez as Chuy Estrada
 Luis Valdez as Ramon Juarez
 Harry Northup as Chief Goon

Reception 
TV Guide rated Which Way Is Up? 1/5 stars and wrote that Pryor plays his character as unlikable, making the film unfunny.

References

External links
 
 
 

1977 films
1977 comedy films
1970s sex comedy films
African-American comedy films
American sex comedy films
American remakes of Italian films
1970s English-language films
Films directed by Michael Schultz
Films produced by Steve Krantz
Films set in Los Angeles
Films set in Venice
Films with screenplays by Carl Gottlieb
Universal Pictures films
1970s American films